Koeman is a Dutch occupational surname. Though the name translates as "cow man" in modern Dutch, it is a derivative, via Kooman, of Koopman (= merchant). People with this name include:

 Martin Koeman (born 1938), Dutch footballer, father of Erwin and Ronald
 Erwin Koeman (born 1961), Dutch football player and manager
 Ronald Koeman (born 1963), Dutch football player and manager
 Lieja Koeman (born 1976), Dutch shot putter

References

Dutch-language surnames
Occupational surnames